Bernhard Luxbacher (born 18 November 1994) is an Austrian footballer who plays for First Vienna.

Career
Luxbacher is a youth exponent from FK Austria Wien. He made his Bundesliga debut at 23 November 2013 against FC Wacker Innsbruck. He replaced Philipp Hosiner after 76 minutes.

Career statistics

References

External links

1994 births
Living people
Austrian footballers
Austrian expatriate footballers
FK Austria Wien players
SKN St. Pölten players
Floridsdorfer AC players
North Carolina FC players
FC Mauerwerk players
Austrian Football Bundesliga players
2. Liga (Austria) players
Austrian Regionalliga players
USL Championship players
Association football midfielders
Austrian expatriate sportspeople in the United States
Expatriate soccer players in the United States